Devious is a Dutch metal band from Hengelo, Overijssel, founded by Frank Schilperoort (drums) and Guido de Jongh (guitar). Devious has toured throughout Europe with Krisiun in 2006 and with Entombed and Merauder in 2009. Devious' latest release Wolfhagen came out in 2012.

Band members 
Guido de Jongh, guitar (founding member)
Frank Schilperoort, drums (founding member)
Wouter, gitaar (since 2000)
Dennis Lusseveld, zang (since 2011)

Former members
Daniël Centiago (bass, 2009–2011)
Arnold oude Middendorp (vocals, 2001–2004, 2008–2011)
Sven van Toorn (bass, 2001–2009)
Coen Tabak (vocals, 2004–2008)

Discography

Wolfhagen 
Mixed and mastered: Soundlodge, Rhauderfehn, Germany.
Release date: 11 May 2012.
Label: self-published.

Track list:
 One Man Horde
 Sinner of Greed
 Wolfhagen
 Her Divine
 Afterlife
 Respiration of Fear 2012
 Respiration of Fear (dnb/dubstep remix)

Vision 
Mixed and mastered: Split Second Sound, Amsterdam, Netherlands.
Release date: 31 August 2009.
Label: Deity Down Records.

Track list:
 Heritage of the Reckless
 False Identity
 Respiration of Fear
 Abide
 Impulse Overload
 Predefined
 Validate
 Disconnect

Domain 
Mixed and mastered: Ground Zero studio, Zutphen, Netherlands.
Release date: 1 February 2007.
Label: Deity Down Records.

Track list:
 Entrance...
 Room 302
 Incantation of the Earthbound
 Boundless Domain
 Misanthropic Entities
 Suoived Pt.II
 The Repentance
 Third World Suicide
 Days of Disorder
 Dead Cannibal Civilization
 Shibito
 Lowest in the Foodchain

Acts of rage 
Recorded at: Ground Zero studio, Zutphen, Netherlands.
Release date: 7 July 2003.
Label: Spitzenburg Records.

Track list:
 Haunted
 Acts of rage
 Harlequin of perpetual destiny
 I'll slice you into pieces
 Suoived (introspection)
 Conjuration of destruction
 Inanimate
 5 Min.'s in decay
 Excavation of the undead
 Dragged below

Mini 2002 
Recorded at: Rooftop studio, Enschede, Netherlands.
Release date: 8 March 2002.
Label: self-published.

Track list:
 Nowhere but lost
 Harlequin of perpetual destiny
 5 Min.'s in decay
 I'll slice you into pieces

External links 
Devious.nl

Dutch heavy metal musical groups
Musical groups established in 1998
Musical groups disestablished in 2014
Musical quintets
Hengelo